The Microleve ML 450 (sometimes ML450) is a Brazilian microlight aircraft that was designed and produced by Microleve of Rio de Janeiro. When it was available the aircraft was supplied as a complete ready-to-fly-aircraft or as a kit for amateur construction.

Design and development
The aircraft features a strut-braced parasol wing, a two-seats-in-side-by-side configuration open or optionally enclosed cockpit, cruciform tail, fixed tricycle landing gear with wheel pants and a small tail skid, and a single engine in pusher configuration.

The aircraft is made from aluminum tubing and composites, with its flying surfaces covered in doped aircraft fabric. The wing is supported by "V" struts, jury struts and cabane struts.

The manufacturer estimated the construction time from the supplied kit as 250 hours.

Operational history
By 1998 the company reported that 250 aircraft were completed and flying.

Even though the aircraft was marketed in the United States, by January 2014 no examples were registered with the Federal Aviation Administration.

Specifications (ML 450)

References

External links
Photo of an ML 450 in flight

ML 450
1990s Brazilian sport aircraft
1990s Brazilian ultralight aircraft
1990s Brazilian civil utility aircraft
Single-engined pusher aircraft
Parasol-wing aircraft
Homebuilt aircraft